Malus spectabilis is a species of crabapple known by the common names Asiatic apple, Chinese crab, HaiTang and Chinese flowering apple.

It is endemic to China and native to the provinces of Hebei, Jiangsu, Liaoning, Qinghai, Shaanxi, Shandong, Sichuan, Yunnan, and Zhejiang.

Description

Malus spectabilis has white or pink flowers, depending on the variety. The fruit is yellow and about 2 centimeters wide.

It is cultivated as an ornamental tree, especially popular in China.

Cultural significance

In 2009, the M. spectabilis flower was named the city flower of Baoji, China.

References

External links

spectabilis
Endemic flora of China
Flora of Hebei
Flora of Jiangsu
Flora of Liaoning
Flora of Qinghai
Flora of Shaanxi
Flora of Shandong
Flora of Sichuan
Flora of Yunnan
Flora of Zhejiang
Garden plants of Asia
Ornamental trees